Jonathan Stewart Cavendish (born 4 February 1959) is a British independent film producer. He is notable for his work on Elizabeth: The Golden Age (2007), Breathe (2017) and the Bridget Jones films. He is a member of the Cavendish family.

Early life
Jonathan Stewart Cavendish was born 4 February 1959, the son of Robin Cavendish and Diana Blacker Cavendish, who became advocates for the disabled following Robin's paralysis by polio in December 1958.

Cavendish studied history at Oxford University.

Career
Cavendish began his career in advertising. He was part of the marketing team behind Channel 4's launch in 1982. After joining Little Bird Productions in 1983, Cavendish has been responsible for acclaimed titles such as In My Father's Den (2004), Croupier (1998) and Trauma (2004), as well as numerous TV projects.

In 2011, he founded The Imaginarium Studios with actor Andy Serkis. The Imaginarium is a creative digital studio based in Ealing, dedicated to the invention of believable, emotionally engaging digital characters using Performance Capture technology. Cavendish had his motion capture "epiphany" while watching King Kong. "To the embarrassment of my children, I cried … and it was only afterwards when I looked up the movie and found out about it that I discovered that inside all of that was little Andy."

On 20 October 2012, the studio acquired rights to The Bone Season by Samantha Shannon and a new motion capture adaptation of Animal Farm. Cavendish will produce both films along with Serkis.

Cavendish commissioned writer William Nicholson to write a screenplay on his father's life and work. The film, Breathe, is directed by Serkis, and opened in October 2017. In it, Cavendish's father, Robin, is portrayed by Andrew Garfield, and his wife, Diana, is portrayed by Claire Foy.<ref name=Daily Bleecker Street and Participant Media acquired the domestic distribution rights to the film at the 2016 Toronto International Film Festival.

Personal life
Cavendish is married to Lesley Ann Rogers. They have triplets, born in 1996.

Filmography

Film

Television

References

External links

1959 births
Living people
European Film Awards winners (people)
British film producers